The 2016–17 Central Michigan Chippewas men's basketball team represented Central Michigan University during the 2016–17 NCAA Division I men's basketball season. The Chippewas, led by fifth-year head coach Keno Davis, played their home games at McGuirk Arena as members of the West Division of the Mid-American Conference. They finished the season 16–16, 6–12 in MAC play to finish in last place in the West Division. As the No. 11 seed in the MAC tournament, they lost in the first round to Kent State.

Previous season
The Chippewas finished the 2015–16 season 17–16, 10–8 in MAC play to finish in a tie for the West Division championship. They lost in the quarterfinals of the MAC tournament to Bowling Green. They were invited to the CollegeInsider.com Tournament where they lost in the first round to Tennessee–Martin.

Departures

Incoming Transfers

Recruiting class of 2016

Recruiting class of 2017

Recruiting class of 2018

Roster

Schedule and results

|-
!colspan=9 style=| Exhibition

|-
!colspan=9 style=| Non-conference regular season

|-
!colspan=9 style=| MAC regular season

|-
!colspan=9 style=| MAC tournament

See also
 2016–17 Central Michigan Chippewas women's basketball team

References

Central Michigan
Central Michigan Chippewas men's basketball seasons